Wabasso is a genus of sheet weavers that was first described by Alfred Frank Millidge in 1984.

Species
 it contains eight species:
Wabasso cacuminatus Millidge, 1984 – Russia, Canada, USA
Wabasso hilairoides Eskov, 1988 – Russia
Wabasso koponeni Tanasevitch, 2006 – Russia
Wabasso millidgei Eskov, 1988 – Russia
Wabasso quaestio (Chamberlin, 1949) (type) – Canada, Greenland
Wabasso replicatus (Holm, 1950) – Northern Europe, northern Russia
Wabasso saaristoi Tanasevitch, 2006 – Russia
Wabasso tungusicus Eskov, 1988 – Russia

See also
 List of Linyphiidae species (Q–Z)

References

Araneomorphae genera
Linyphiidae
Spiders of North America
Spiders of Russia